The 14th Regiment Illinois Volunteer Cavalry was a cavalry regiment that served in the Union Army during the American Civil War.

Service
The first two battalions of the  14th Illinois Cavalry were mustered into service at Peoria, Illinois, on January 7, 1863. The third battalion was mustered at Peoria on February 6, 1863.

The regiment was mustered out on July 31, 1865.

Total strength and casualties
The regiment suffered 2 officers and 23 enlisted men who were killed in action or who died of their wounds  and 190 enlisted men who died of disease, for a total of 215 fatalities.

Commanders
Colonel Horace Capron - resigned January 23, 1865
Colonel Francis Davison - mustered out with the regiment.

See also
List of Illinois Civil War Units
Illinois in the American Civil War

Notes

References
The Civil War Archive

Units and formations of the Union Army from Illinois
Peoria, Illinois
1863 establishments in Illinois
Military units and formations established in 1863
Military units and formations disestablished in 1865